Blackfriars Priory School is a private Roman Catholic school for boys situated in Prospect, an inner-northern suburb of Adelaide, South Australia. It is conducted by the Dominican Friars of the Province of the Assumption.

History
The school opened in 1953 in its current location which was then a property called "St Catharine's". The house, which is now part of the school, was built for James Angas Johnson (1841-1909), a grandson of George Fife Angas.

Statue

In November 2017, Blackfriars covered up and eventually removed an outdoor statue of St. Martin de Porres after its "unintentionally provocative design . . . created a flurry of activity on social media, prompting the school to take quick action," according to a news report.

The statue depicted the figure of St. Martin "handing a young boy a loaf of bread, which appears to have emerged from his cloak." The boy's head is waist-high with the body of the priest. Students posted photos of it on social media, and the next week it was "cordoned off." A photo shows it covered with a black drape.

Principal Simon Cobiac said in a statement that another sculptor would refashion the statue.

Houses

Notable alumni

Arts 
Harrison Gilbertson, actor
John Schumann, singer

Public life 
Leon Bignell, politician
Don Farrell, Labor senator
David O'Loughlin, politician
Jack Snelling, politician

Sport 
Carlo Armiento, football (soccer) player
Rohan Dennis, cyclist
Alan Didak, Australian rules football player
Callum Ferguson, cricket player
Ben Hart, Australian rules football player
Ben Holland, Australian rules football player
Nick Holland, Australian rules football player
Mark Jamar, Australian rules football player
Teeboy Kamara, football (soccer) player
Joe Mullen, football (soccer) player
Martin McKinnon, Australian rules football player
Oleg Markov, Australian rules football player
Sean Tasker, Australian rules football player
Boyd Woodcock, Australian rules football player

References

Boys' schools in South Australia
Dominican schools in Australia
Educational institutions established in 1953
High schools in South Australia
Junior School Heads Association of Australia Member Schools
Catholic primary schools in Adelaide
1953 establishments in Australia